
Year 458 (CDLVIII) was a common year starting on Wednesday (link will display the full calendar) of the Julian calendar. At the time, it was known as the Year of the Consulship of Maiorianus and Leo (or, less frequently, year 1211 Ab urbe condita). The denomination 458 for this year has been used since the early medieval period, when the Anno Domini calendar era became the prevalent method in Europe for naming years.

Events 
 By place 
 Roman Empire 
 Emperor Majorian builds a Roman fleet at Miseno and Ravenna. He strengthens the army, by recruiting a large number of barbarian mercenaries (Bastarnae, Burgundians, Huns, Ostrogoths, Rugii, Scythians and Suebi).
 Summer – The Vandals land in Campania, at the mouth of the Liri or the Garigliano River, and devastate the region. Majorian personally leads the Roman army and defeats the invaders near Sinuessa, destroying their ships on the seashore, loaded with booty. 
 Battle of Arelate: Majorian defeats the Visigoths under King Theodoric II at Arles (Southern Gaul), near the Rhone River. Theodoric is forced to sign a peace treaty and becomes a foederatus (pl. foederati) of the Western Roman Empire.
 Winter – Majorian enters the Rhone Valley, and defeats the Burgundians under King Gondioc at Lugdunum. He forces the Bagaudae to join the western coalition against the Suebi in Spain.

 Europe 
 Childeric I succeeds his father Merovech as king of the Salian Franks. He establishes his capital at Tournai (modern Belgium) and becomes a foederatus (pl. foederati) of the Western Roman Empire.

 Asia 
 Jabi becomes the king of the Korean kingdom of Silla.

 By topic 
 Exploration and Colonization 
 The city of Tbilisi (Georgia) on the Kura River is founded by King Vakhtang I of Iberia. Its location gives it control of the trade routes between western and eastern Transcaucasia.

 Religion 
 July 3 – Gennadius I becomes patriarch of Constantinople.

Births 
 Damascius, Syrian neoplatonist (approximate date) 
 Xiao Zhangmao, crown prince of Southern Qi (d. 493)

Deaths 
 July 3 – Anatolius, patriarch of Constantinople
 Nulji, king of Silla (Korea)

References